Croft and Huncote Quarry is a  geological Site of Special Scientific Interest north of Croft in Leicestershire. It is a Geological Conservation Review site.

This site exposes igneous tonalite rocks 452 million years old, in the Ordivician period, and it helps to document the growth of continental crust beneath central England. This layer is unconformably overlain by Triassic mineralised manganese.

The site is private land with no public access.

References

Sites of Special Scientific Interest in Leicestershire
Geological Conservation Review sites